The Ganga Damodar Express is an Express train belonging to East Central Railway zone that runs between  and  in India. It is currently being operated with 13329/13330 train numbers on a daily basis.

Service

The 13329/Ganga Damodar Express has an average speed of 48 km/hr and covers 292 km in 6h 5m. The 13330/Ganga Damodar Express has an average speed of 50 km/hr and covers 292 km in 5h 50m.

Route and halts 

The important halts of the train are:

Coach composition

The train has standard ICF Utkrisht rakes with max speed of 110 kmph. The train consists of 24 coaches :

 1 AC First Class cum II Tier
 2 AC II Tier
 4 AC III Tier
 9 Sleeper Coaches
 6 General
 2 Seating cum Luggage Rake

Traction

Both trains are hauled by Gomoh Loco Shed-based WAP-7 or Din Dayal Upadhyay Loco Shed-based WAP-4 electric locomotive from Patna to Dhanbad and vice versa.

Direction reversal

The train reverses its direction 1 times:

Rake sharing

The train shares its rake with 13331/13332 Dhanbad–Patna Intercity Express

See also 

 Rajendra Nagar Terminal railway station
 Dhanbad Junction railway station
 South Bihar Express
 Dhanbad–Patna Intercity Express

Notes

External links 

 13329/Ganga Damodar Express
 13330/Ganga Damodar Express

References 

Transport in Patna
Transport in Dhanbad
Named passenger trains of India
Rail transport in Jharkhand
Rail transport in Bihar
Express trains in India